This is a list of alleged sightings of unidentified flying objects or UFOs in Belarus.

1985 
 In 1985, an Aeroflot plane reported sighting a bright light while flying over Minsk while en route from Tbilisi to Tallinn.

See also 
 List of major UFO sightings

References

External links 
 MUFON - Last 20 UFO Sightings and Pictures

Belarus
Historical events in Belarus